Ceglusa is a monotypic genus of Burmese jumping spiders containing the single species, Ceglusa polita. It was first described by Tamerlan Thorell in 1895, and is only found in Myanmar. Its taxonomic relationships within the family are unknown.

References

Further reading

Endemic fauna of Myanmar
Monotypic Salticidae genera
Salticidae
Spiders of Asia
Taxa named by Tamerlan Thorell